Ninotchka is a 1960 American TV film. It is a remake of the 1939 Greta Garbo film Ninotchka. It was directed by Tom Donovan.

Cast
Maria Schell as Ninotchka
Gig Young as Leon 
Mischa Auer as Buljanoff
Leon Belasco as Iranoff
Henry Lascoe as Kopalski
Friedrich von Ledebur		
Zsa Zsa Gabor
William Hansen		
Gerald Hiken		
Anne Meara as Anna
Boris Tumarin

Production
It was one of a series of movies that David Susskind and his Talent Associates adapted for television. The starring role was given to Maria Schell who had just appeared in a TV adaptation of For Whom the Bell Tolls. Schell said she had not seen the film. She added that Billy Wilder told her "This is a girl who feels she has to be in love with mankind -and she falls in love with a man."

Reception
The Los Angeles Times called it an "expert production". The Chicago Tribune said Schell "couldn't have been a bigger hit." The New York Times called it a "highly polished production" which had "dated".

References

External links

1960 films